Inanwatan is a small coastal town in Southwest Papua, Indonesia. The town is located on the southern coast of the Bird's Head Peninsula.

The area was named by the colonists from Patipi, who were impressed by the extent of the sago swamps here. The word inanwatan originates in a Patipi-language expression meaning "it is all sago" (from inan 'sago' and sewatan 'one').

References

Populated places in Southwest Papua